Jakko is a given name. Notable people with the name include:

 Jakko Jakszyk (born 1958), British musician, record producer, and actor
 Jakko Jan Leeuwangh (born 1972), Dutch speed skater

See also
 Jaakko Mäntyjärvi (born 1963), Finnish composer